Tuggerah Aerodrome was an aerodrome constructed in 1942 by the Royal Australian Air Force as a dispersal ground and landing ground at Tuggerah, New South Wales, Australia during World War II. 

The runway ran south west to north east and was 5000 ft long x 150 ft wide. The aerodrome had eight hideouts for medium bombers constructed.  The United States Navy's Fleet Air Wing leased the aerodrome as a satellite field for Fleurs Aerodrome near Kemps Creek, New South Wales.

The aerodrome was abandoned after World War II.

References
Woy Woy Blog

Former Royal Australian Air Force bases